The stripenose guitarfish (Acroteriobatus variegatus) is a species of fish in the Rhinobatidae family endemic to the eastern coast of India, and Sri Lanka.  Its natural habitat is in the neritic zone.

Habitat
The stripenose guitarfish lives mainly at the depths of 10 to 40 meters, although specimens of the stripenose guitarfish have been collected at 366 meters. There is some information that indicates that they prefer coral reefs.

Size
The stripenose guitarfish is a small fish, with males reaching up to 65 centimeters in length and 75 centimeters for females.. They have a small litter size, usually giving birth to 1 from 4 and at most 6. The generation length of each fish is around five years.

Endangerment
The population of the stripenose guitarfish is declining significantly due to fishing by trawlers on the coast of India and Sri Lanka.

References

Acroteriobatus
Endemic fauna of India
Endemic fauna of Sri Lanka
Fish of India
Fish of Sri Lanka
Fish described in 1973